Clea Rosemary Smith (born 6 January 1979) is an Australian former cricket player. She played in the Australian national cricket team in all three formats: Test, One Day International (ODI), and Twenty20 International (T20I).

Cricket career
Smith played 165 domestic limited overs matches for the Victorian Spirit including 117 Women's National Cricket League (WNCL) games. She also played 37 Women's Twenty20 cricket matches. In November 2007, she took a hat-trick bowling in a WNCL match against Western Australia. She finished the match with 5 wickets and conceded only 10 runs, which were the best bowling figures she achieved in her career. When she retired from cricket, she was one of only three bowlers to take a hat-trick in a WNCL match.

Smith played one test, 48 One Day Internationals and 13 Twenty20 Internationals for Australia. She holds the record for the highest ever test score made by a female cricketer in Women's cricket history batting at number 11 of 42 runs. She retired in May 2012 after a 14-year playing career.

References

External links

Living people
1979 births
Cricketers from Melbourne
Australia women Test cricketers
Australia women One Day International cricketers
Australia women Twenty20 International cricketers